Goddess of Anarchy: The Life and Times of Lucy Parsons, American Radical is a biography of Lucy Parsons written by Jacqueline Jones and published by Basic Books in December 2017.

Further reading

External links 

 
Book Review by Jon Bekken

2017 non-fiction books
Basic Books books
American biographies
English-language books
Biographies about anarchists